Príncipe da Paz is the tenth album in the live praise and worship series of contemporary worship music by Diante do Trono.

Background 

In the pre-recording of the Príncipe da Paz, the mining group released the Por Amor de Ti, Oh Brasil album, recorded at the Yamada Arena, in Belém.

Recorded on a symbolic day 7/7/7 date (the number 7 in the Bible is God's number, the number of perfection), the album was recorded at the Sambadrome of Rio de Janeiro, where the carnival is held, with more than 100 thousand present.

The work sold over 370,000 copies and received a gold disc symbol, from the NovoDisc.

Track listings

CD

DVD

References

2007 live albums
2007 video albums
Live video albums
Diante do Trono video albums
Diante do Trono live albums
Portuguese-language live albums